Neil Louw is a paralympic athlete from South Africa competing mainly in category TS4 sprint events.

Neil was part of the South African Paralympic team that travelled to Barcelona for the 1992 Summer Paralympics, there he competed in the 100m, 200m and 400m finishing with bronze medals in both the 200m and 400m.

References

External links
 

Paralympic athletes of South Africa
Athletes (track and field) at the 1992 Summer Paralympics
Paralympic bronze medalists for South Africa
Living people
Year of birth missing (living people)
Medalists at the 1992 Summer Paralympics
Paralympic medalists in athletics (track and field)
South African male sprinters
20th-century South African people
Sprinters with limb difference
Paralympic sprinters